The 2005–06 Croatian Football Cup was the fifteenth season of Croatia's football knockout competition.

Calendar

Preliminary round
The preliminary round was held on 31 August 2005.

First round
Matches played on 21 September 2005.

Second round
Matches played on 19 October 2005.

Quarter-finals
First legs were held on 9 November and second legs on 15 November 2005.

|}

Semi-finals

First legs

Second legs

Rijeka won 2–1 on aggregate.

Varteks won 5–4 on aggregate.

Final

First leg

Second leg

Aggregate score was 5–5, Rijeka won on away goals rule.

See also
2005–06 Croatian First Football League
2005–06 Croatian Second Football League

External links
Official website 

Croatian Football Cup seasons
Croatian Cup, 2005-06
Croatian Cup, 2005-06